Leah Kalmenson, known professionally as Leah Kate (born September 9, 1992), is an American singer.

Kate released her debut extended play, Impulse, in June 2019 followed up by What Just Happened? in 2021. In 2022, she released the single "10 Things I Hate About You", which charted in Australia and the UK. In March 2022 Madison Beer announced Kate as the opener of the European leg of her Life Support Tour, taking place in March and April 2022. Following the tour, Kate released "Twinkle Twinkle Little Bitch" and "Life Sux". In October 2022, Leah released her third EP Alive and Unwell.

Early life
Leah Kate was born and raised in Los Angeles, California and her family owned a radio station. Kate revealed, that she lived in New York for a while to follow her dreams. Her family wanted her to get a job, however she continued to pursue a career in music.

Career

In 2018, Kate began posting song covers on her self-titled YouTube channel. In this period of time she released her debut EP, Impulse, which included the singles "WTF?" and "So Good". She followed up the EP with the release of singles "Visions" and "Bad Idea". In June 2020, Kate released "Fuck Up the Friendship" which picked up traction on TikTok and was streamed over 33 million times on Spotify. She followed this up with several singles including the releases of "Grave", "Boyfriend" and "Boy Next Door".

In 2021, Kate released the singles "Calabasas" and "Veronica" in preparation for her second EP, What Just Happened?, which was due for release that October. She had plans to open up for Bailey Bryan on her Fresh Start Tour across the United States and Canada but it was cut to only two shows due to the COVID-19 pandemic. She released the single "Shit Show" a week in advance of the EP on September 24, 2021. The EP's fifth and final single "F U Anthem" was later released.

She released the single "Dear Denny" in March 2022 and following it going viral on TikTok, quickly followed up with the release of "10 Things I Hate About You", her first song on a major label, 10k Projects. The song continued growing on TikTok and grew in many European countries as she toured with Madison Beer on the European leg of her Life Support Tour. The song would eventually reach number two on the US Bubbling Under Hot 100 chart and reached the top 40 of charts in Australia, New Zealand, the Netherlands and the United Kingdom.

In 2022, she also toured with Chase Atlantic on their Cold Nights Tour across North America and released her single "Twinkle Twinkle Little Bitch". She followed this release with singles such as "Life Sux", "Monster", and "Hot All the Time" all expected to be included on her third EP, "Alive and Unwell" due for release on October 28 2022. She kicked off her first headline tour, the "Alive and Unwell Tour" in Manchester on the same day.

In December 2022, Kate toured Australia for the first time, performing shows in Sydney and Melbourne.

Discography

Extended plays

Singles

Tours 
Headlining
 Alive and Unwell Tour (2022)

Opening
 Life Support Tour – Madison Beer (2022)
 Cold Nights Tour – Chase Atlantic (2022)

References

1995 births
American alternative rock musicians
American pop rock singers
21st-century American women singers
21st-century American singers
Living people
Pop punk singers
Singers from Los Angeles
American women pop singers